Martin Kusch (born 19 October 1959) is Professor of philosophy at the University of Vienna. Until 2009, Kusch was Professor of Philosophy and Sociology of science at the Department of History and Philosophy of Science at Cambridge University. Prior to Cambridge, Kusch was lecturer in the Science Studies Unit of the University of Edinburgh.

Biography 
Kusch's wide-ranging contributions to philosophy reflect both systematic and historical interests and cut across traditional disciplinary divides. He has published in the philosophy of the social sciences, epistemology, philosophy of language and mind, philosophy of the natural sciences, philosophy of technology, and the history of German and Austrian philosophy.

Kusch has also made important contributions to science and technology studies, particularly in the field of the sociology of scientific knowledge.

In addition, Kusch has written on the history of science with a special reference to the history of German psychology.

In 2005, he delivered the Leibniz Lectures at Leibniz University Hannover.

Selected publications

Books 
  Reports from the Philosophy Department of the University of Jyväskylä.

Journal articles 
  Pdf.

Other

References

External links
 Kusch's web page

1959 births
20th-century German philosophers
21st-century German philosophers
Academics of the University of Cambridge
Academics of the University of Edinburgh
Living people
Sociologists of science
Academic staff of the University of Vienna
German male writers
European Research Council grantees